The German U-boat U-864 was attacked and sunk on 9 February 1945 by , a V-class submarine of the Royal Navy. Venturer was patrolling the waters around Fedje Island, off the Norwegian coast in the North Sea. The sinking remains the only incident in the history of naval warfare where one submarine sank another while both were submerged.

Background

U-864

60°46′10″N 4°37′15″E

U-864 was a Type IX U-boat ( Ralf-Reimar Wolfram) on a clandestine mission, Operation Caesar, to the Empire of Japan. On 6 February 1945, U-864 passed through the Fedje area off the Norwegian coast without being detected but an engine kept misfiring. In 1986, G. P. Jones wrote that sound probably came from "noisy machinery". In 2013, Preisler and Sewell wrote that an air compressor may have been wrongly installed or had worn out causing the engine to misfire with "loud, fitful vibrations". There were many Allied (primarily British) ships, submarines and aircraft in the area on anti-submarine patrol. Wolfram decided to return to the pens at Bergen to repair the engine. The British were reading the German machine cypher, Enigma and the Royal Navy was concerned the secret cargo might enable the Japanese to extend the duration of the Pacific War. The Admiralty ordered the submarine Venturer to intercept and destroy U-864.

HMS Venturer

When the British got wind of the operation through Enigma decrypts, Venturer was ordered to destroy U-864, which was in the area. Venturer (Lieutenant Jimmy Launders) received the following brief message from the Admiralty,

Launders, to prevent U-864 from detecting Venturer while he was searching, decided to switch off Venturers ASDIC (sonar) and rely solely on hydrophones. U-864 sailed back past Fedje and the area where Venturer was located.

Action

As Venturer continued her patrol of the waters around Fedje, her hydrophone operator noticed a strange sound which he could not identify. He thought that the noise sounded as though some local fisherman had started a diesel engine. Launders decided to track the strange noise. Then the officer of the watch on Venturer's periscope noticed what he thought was another periscope above the surface of the water. It is highly likely he had, in fact, spotted the U-boats snorkel. The snorkel was still a new device and probably unknown to Launders and his crew. The snorkel limited the U-boat's speed and depth. For Launders' hydrophone operator to hear diesel noises from a submerged U-boat, the snorkel would have had to be in operation. The noise of the diesel engines made the U-boat's hydrophones much less effective and it is doubtful U-864 would have heard Venturer running slowly on her electric motors. Combined with the hydrophone reports of the strange noise, which he decided was coming from a submerged vessel, Launders surmised they had found U-864. He tracked the U-boat's course by hydrophone, hoping she would surface and allow a clear shot. U-864 remained at snorkel depth and as the hydrophone plot emerged, it was noted that the U-boat was zigzagging. This made the German submarine quite safe according to the assumptions of the time.

Launders tracked the U-boat for about three hours, it became obvious she was not going to surface and Launder had to decide on whether to attack before his batteries lost their charge. It was theoretically possible to compute a firing solution in all four dimensionstime, distance, bearing and target depthbut this had never been tried because it was assumed that performing the complex calculations would be impossible, plus there were unknown factors that had to be approximated.

In most torpedo attacks, the target could be seen; the target's angle relative to the attacker and its bearing would be observed, then a rangefinder in the periscope was used to establish the distance to the target; from this speed could be derived and a basic mechanical computer would offset the aiming point for the torpedo, the depth of which had to be set based on target identification. Too deep and the torpedo would pass under the target, too shallow (in this instance) it would miss above. Launders could only estimate the depth of his target as they tried to manoeuvre into a firing position without giving their position away by creating excessive noise or exhausting their batteries.

Launders made the calculations and assumptions about U-864'''s defensive manoeuvres, then ordered the firing of all four of his bow torpedo tubes and dived immediately to avoid retaliation by U-864. The torpedoes were fired with a 17.5 second delay between each pair and at different depths. U-864 attempted to evade once it heard the torpedoes coming but lacked manoeuvrability in dives and turns; it took time to retract the snorkel, disengage the diesel and start the electric motors. The first three torpedoes were avoided,but U-864 unknowingly steered into the path of the fourth.

AftermathU-864'' sank  from the U-boat pens in Bergen. Launders was awarded a bar to his Distinguished Service Order (DSO) and several members of his crew received awards. The action was the only naval engagement ever to have been fought entirely underwater.

References

Bibliography

Further reading

External links
 
 
 

Battle of the Atlantic
A
Naval battles of World War II involving Germany
Submarine warfare in World War II
Conflicts in 1945
1945 in Norway
February 1945 events